Felixstow is a suburb of Adelaide, situated in the City of Norwood Payneham St Peters.

It was reportedly named by Thomas Stow, who had been the first European to take up pastoral duties in the area, by combining the Latin word for "happy" with the Old English word for "place". His son, Augustine Stow, later had a vineyard at Felixstow.

Felixstow Post Office opened as Hectorville Post Office on 1 July 1882 and was renamed Felixstow Post Office on 15 August 1963.

The historic Forsyth House (now the Aldersgate Nursing Home) is listed on the South Australian Heritage Register.

References

Suburbs of Adelaide